The Binge Eating Scale is a sixteen item questionnaire used to assess the presence of binge eating behavior indicative of an eating disorder. It was devised by J. Gormally et al. in 1982 specifically for use with obese individuals. The questions are based upon both behavioral characteristics (e.g., amount of food consumed) and the  emotional, cognitive response, guilt or shame.

Scoring

Each question has 3–4 separate responses assigned a numerical value. The score range is from 0–46:
 Non-binging; less than 17
 Moderate binging; 18–26
 Severe binging; 27 and greater

See also
Binge eating disorder
Bulimia nervosa
Eating disorders

References

External links
 Binge Eating Scale - Online Questionnaire

Eating disorders screening and assessment tools